Marseille is the second-largest city of France.

Marseille or Marseilles may also refer to:

Places

France
Marseille-en-Beauvaisis, in the Oise department
Marseilles-lès-Aubigny, in the Cher department

South Africa
Marseilles, Free State

United States
Marseilles, Illinois, United States
Marseilles, Ohio, United States
Marseilles Township, Wyandot County, Ohio, United States

People
Hans-Joachim Marseille, (1919–1942), German flying ace of the Second World War
Jacques Marseille, French historian, economist, and universal basic income advocate
Raymond of Marseille, a medieval astronomer

Art, entertainment, and media

Films
Marseille (2004 film), a 2004 German film
Marseille (2016 film), a 2016 French film
Marseille trilogy, a series of French films by Marcel Pagnol comprising: Marius (1931), Fanny (1932), and César (1936)

Music

Groups
Marseille (band), a band from Liverpool, England
Hey Marseilles, a band from Seattle, WA

Songs
"La Marseillaise", the French national anthem
"Marseilles", a popular song by Australian band The Angels

Other arts, entertainment, and media
Marseille (TV series), a 2016 Netflix television series
Hanna-Justina Marseille, a fictional character from the anime/manga Strike Witches

Sports
Olympique de Marseille, a French professional football (soccer) team

See also
Marsiglia (disambiguation)
Massilia (disambiguation)